The 1983–84 Maltese Premier League was the 4th season of the Maltese Premier League, and the 69th season of top-tier football in Malta.  It was contested by 8 teams, and Valletta F.C. won the championship.

First stage

Results

Second stage

Championship group

Relegation group

References
Malta - List of final tables (RSSSF)

Maltese Premier League seasons
Malta
1983–84 in Maltese football